Bašići is a village in the municipality of Gacko, Bosnia and Herzegovina. It is located in the Republika Srpska entity within the country Bosnia and Herzegovina.

References

Villages in Republika Srpska
Populated places in Gacko